Friesenheim can refer to the following places:
 Friesenheim (Baden-Württemberg), in Baden-Württemberg, Germany
 Friesenheim, Rhineland-Palatinate, in Rhineland-Palatinate, Germany
 Friesenheim, Bas-Rhin, in Alsace, France
 Ludwigshafen-Friesenheim, one of the two "mother villages" of Ludwigshafen